Fultonville is a village in Montgomery County, New York, United States. The village is named after Robert Fulton, inventor of the steamboat.

The Fultonville Village is on the south bank of the Mohawk River in the Town of Glen. It is west of Amsterdam, and is sometimes jokingly referred to as South Fonda due to the two villages being in such close proximity with Fonda being more regionally dominant.

In 2019, the area of the village that had been developed in the 19th and early 20th centuries was listed on the National Register of Historic Places as the Fultonville Historic District in recognition of its well-preserved architecture from its original settlement, the era centering around the development of the Erie Canal, and afterwards.

History
The area was located near to the site of the Mohawk village of Andagaron during the middle of the seventeenth century, which was located about a mile to the west.

The first white settlement on the site was made around 1750 by John Evart Van Epps, and was called "Van Epps Swamp" due to the swampland by the river. During the American Revolution, the homes that were located here were burned.

Fultonville was founded around 1824 in anticipation of the opening of the Erie Canal and was incorporated as a village on August 9, 1848.

The West Shore Railroad, which was later absorbed into the New York Central system, erected a station in the village in 1889.

John Henry Starin was born in August of 1825 in Sammonsville on the north side of the Mohawk, when the Erie Canal was in its infancy. His father, Myndert, had a tavern along the river and his grandfather, John, was a farmer who had served in the military during the American Revolution. The family was successful and had some money, but Starin would become one of the richest men in America as president of the Starin City River & Harbor Transportation Co. and as director of the North River Bank in New York City and the Fultonville National Bank.

Original Trustees 

Howland Fish - President
Andrew J Yates
William B Wemple
Thomas R Horton
Delancey D Starin

Mayors 

John Synder [1951-1957] 
George Wadsworth [1987-1995]
Daniel Szabo [1995-2000] [Resigned]
Robert Headwell [2000-2016] 
George Donaldson (Interim) [2017]
Ryan B. Weitz [2017] [Resigned after one month] 
 Linda Petterson-Law [Appointed May 2017, elected 2018]

2016 presidential election 

Hillary Clinton (D)-144 27.61%
Donald Trump (R)-352 66.88%
Johnson (L)-18 3.42%
Jill Stein (G)-11 2.09%

At the time of incorporation, the village's population numbered 630. In 1875, the population had increased to 1220.

Attractions

Poplar Mist boat tours
With operations commencing in 1993, the Poplar Hotel/Restaurant offered a two and a half hour boat trip down the Mohawk River on a 102-passenger boat from mid-May through mid-October.

Cobblestone Hall and Free Library
Cobblestone Hall and Free Library was built sometime before 1868 when the house belonged to C. B. Freeman. Freeman was the proprietor of Fultonville Steam Mills. He lived at this residence until at least 1878 when F. W. Beers published a history of Montgomery and Fulton Counties. By 1905, a large wooden addition had been made to the rear of the building which was then called "Cobblestone Free Hall and Library." Most of the building still stands aside from the addition, and has since been converted into a private residence.

Geography
Fultonville is located at  (42.946764, -74.369395).

The village is on the south bank of the Mohawk River with the Village of Fonda on the opposite shore, linked by a bridge carrying NY-30A. The Mohawk River is part of the Erie Canal at this location.

The New York State Thruway (Interstate 90) passes through the community.  New York State Route 5S (Maple Avenue), parallels the Thruway and intersects New York State Route 30A (Main Street) in Fultonville.

Demographics

As of the census of 2000, 710 people, 279 households, and 191 families resided in the village. The population density was 1,590.0 people per square mile (571.1/km). The 309 housing units create an average density of 642.8 per square mile (248.6/km). The racial makeup of the village was 99.00% White, 1.00% Latino. A total of 99.52% spoke English, 0.36% spoke German and 0.12% spoke Polish.

33.0% of households had children under age 18 living with them. 44.4% were married couples living together. 17.6% had a female householder with no husband present. 31.2% were non-families. 25.8% of all households were made up of single individuals and 11.8% had someone living alone aged 65+. The average household size was 2.50 and the average family size was 2.96.

27.7% were under age 18, 9.4% from 18 to 24, 26.9% from 25 to 44, 21.4% from 45 to 64, and 14.5% who were 65+. The median age was 35. For every 100 females, the village hosted 87.3 males. For every 100 females age 18 and over, there were 88.6 males.

The median household income was $32,361, and the median family income was $34,167. Males had a median income of $30,500 versus $20,909 for females. The per capita income for the village was $15,283. About 3.4% of families and 6.9% of the population were below the poverty line, including 3.3% of those under age 18 and 4.5% of those age 65 or over.

Education
Fultonville is within the Fonda-Fultonville Central School District, located in Fonda.

Religion

 Fultonville Reformed Church
 Fonda-Fultonville United Methodist Church [Torn down after fire March 14, 2017]
 Calvary Baptist Church [No Longer in Use]

Cemeteries

 Maple Avenue Cemetery - Est. 1874
 Old Fultonville Cemetery

See also

National Register of Historic Places listings in Montgomery County, New York

References

External links
 
  Area history for Fultonville

Villages in New York (state)
Villages in Montgomery County, New York
Populated places on the Mohawk River
National Register of Historic Places in Montgomery County, New York